Loxo may refer to:

 Loxo (nymph), one of the nymphs of archery in Greek mythology
 Loxo, a character in the 1934 novel Speedy in Oz
 Loxo (Dungeons & Dragons), a fictional monster in roleplaying games